Bogi may refer to:

 Bogi Fabian (born 1984), Hungarian artist Boglárka Réka Fábián
 Bogi Løkin (born 1998), Faroese footballer
 Bogi Thorarensen Melsteð (1860–1929), Icelandic historian
 Bogi Þorsteinsson (1918–1998), first chairman of the Icelandic Basketball Association
 Bogi (singer) (born 1997), Hungarian singer Boglárka Dallos-Nyers
 Nickname of Sarah Lateiner, American auto mechanic and reality television personality
 Giorgio Bogi (born 1929), Italian surgeon and politician

See also
 Bogie (disambiguation)
 Bhogi, the first day of an Indian harvest festival